Svetlana Sergeyevna Zhurova (born 7 January 1972) is a speed skater from Russia and a deputy at the State Duma of the Russian Federation.

Career
Zhurova has been competing internationally since 1989, took part in four Olympics, but did not win her first Olympic medal until her fourth Olympics, winning Olympic gold in Turin in 2006, two years after mothering a child. She also became Sprint World Champion in 2006. After her sporting career she became a politician and became Vice Speaker of the fifth State Duma as part of the ruling United Russia party.

Canadian sanctions
On December 19, 2014, Zhurova was placed on the Canadian sanctions list for the Ukrainian crisis.

In 2023, she lashed out at the Canadian Olympic Committee for their support of Ukraine's territorial integrity and Ukrainian athletes:

References

External links

Svetlana Zhurova at SkateResults.com
Svetlana Zhurova's athlete profile at cnnsi.com
Photos of Svetlana Zhurova – At Lars Hagen's DESG Photo website

1972 births
Living people
Olympic speed skaters of Russia
Olympic gold medalists for Russia
Speed skaters at the 1994 Winter Olympics
Speed skaters at the 1998 Winter Olympics
Speed skaters at the 2002 Winter Olympics
Speed skaters at the 2006 Winter Olympics
Olympic medalists in speed skating
Russian female speed skaters
Medalists at the 2006 Winter Olympics
Russian sportsperson-politicians
21st-century Russian politicians
Russian State University of Physical Education, Sport, Youth and Tourism alumni
Fifth convocation members of the State Duma (Russian Federation)
Sixth convocation members of the State Duma (Russian Federation)
Seventh convocation members of the State Duma (Russian Federation)
Eighth convocation members of the State Duma (Russian Federation)
Members of the Federation Council of Russia (after 2000)
Anti-Romanian sentiment
Russian individuals subject to European Union sanctions